Qara Kand or Qarakand may refer to:
 Karakend (Nagorno-Karabakh)
 Qara Kand, Asadabad, Hamadan Province, Iran
 Qarakand, Razan, Hamadan Province, Iran
 Qara Kand, West Azerbaijan, Iran